Llewellyn Worldwide (formerly Llewellyn Publications) is a New Age publisher based in Woodbury, Minnesota. Llewellyn's mission is to "serve the trade and consumers worldwide with options and tools for exploring new worlds of mind & spirit, thereby aiding in the quests of expanded human potential, spiritual consciousness, and planetary awareness."

History
Llewellyn Publications was formed in 1901 by Llewellyn George in Portland, Oregon. At first the company concentrated exclusively on astrology, in the form of both books and annuals. Later, Llewellyn began to branch out into other New Age topics such as alternative healing, psychic development, and earth-centered religions, among others. In 1920 Llewellyn Publications moved from Portland to Los Angeles, California. George died in 1954 and the company was bought by Carl L. Weschcke in 1961, who then moved the headquarters to St. Paul, Minnesota.

During the 1960s and 1970s, Llewellyn published books from authors such as Dion Fortune and Aleister Crowley writing on occult and other topics. President and publisher Weschcke founded a series of Gnostic Aquarian festivals to help create a broader audience. Llewellyn went on to publish books such as Raymond Buckland's 1986 Buckland's Complete Book of Witchcraft, Scott Cunningham's 1988 Wicca: A Guide for the Solitary Practitioner, and Ted Andrews' 1993 Animal Speak, a shamanistic guide to totem animals. The company also expanded into tarot decks, magical kits, and materials for younger readers.

Declines in sales in 2001 spurred the company toward layoffs and a restructure of its sales and marketing departments in 2002. By the end of 2003 the company had rebounded with $16 million in gross sales. In July 2005, Llewellyn moved its offices to the St. Paul suburb of Woodbury.

On February 1, 2005, Llewellyn launched its first fiction imprint, Midnight Ink. A year later, Llewellyn launched its second fiction imprint, Flux Books.

Notable authors
The company publishes a wide offering of non-fiction books by such noted authors as Scott Cunningham, Michael Newton, Donald Michael Kraig, Richard Webster, Silver RavenWolf, Karen Mehringer, and Mark A. Michaels & Patricia Johnson.

Authors for its fiction lines include Maggie Stiefvater, Simone Elkeles, Laurie Faria Stolarz, Kirstin Cronn-Mills, Amanda Grace (a pen name for author Mandy Hubbard), Kelsey Sutton, A.S. King, and Nick James.

References

External links
 

New Age organizations
Modern pagan media
Book publishing companies based in Minnesota
Publishing companies established in 1901